The Dan Wesson M1911 pistol is a series of model 1911 semi-automatic pistols.

Dan Wesson M1911 pistols are made at the Dan Wesson Firearms manufacturing facility in Norwich, New York.  They are marketed and distributed by CZ-USA.

Dan Wesson M1911 models

Collectors models 
 Dan Wesson model DW PT - Patriot
 Dan Wesson model DW RZ-10 - Razorback
 Dan Wesson model DW PM-3P - Pointman Minor
 Dan Wesson model DW PM1S  - Pointman Major
 Dan Wesson model DW PM1B  - Pointman Major
 Dan Wesson model DW PM7   - Pointman 7
 Dan Wesson model DW PMA-S - Pointman Aussie
 Dan Wesson model DW PMA-B - Pointman Aussie
 Dan Wesson model DW K03-B - Panther
 Dan Wesson model DW K03-S - Panther
 Dan Wesson model DW Silverback Stainless

Current models 
 Dan Wesson model DW RZ-10 - Razorback
 Dan Wesson model DW Commander Cls Bobtail (discontinued in 2010 except for California market)
 Dan Wesson model DW Pointman Seven (discontinued in 2010 except for California market)
 Dan Wesson model DW Valor
 Dan Wesson model DW V-Bob (Valor Bobtail)
 Dan Wesson model DW SS Custom
 Dan Wesson model DW RZ-45 - Heritage

Model designations 
According to Dave Severns on 1911Forum.com, these are the common Dan Wesson model designations:

Notes

External links

Dan Wesson Firearms official website (actual models)
 Dan Wesson Values - 27th Edition of the Blue Book
Dan Wesson Firearms 1911 Series Instruction Manual
Dan Wesson Commander Bobtail 1911 Range Report

.45 ACP semi-automatic pistols
9mm Parabellum semi-automatic pistols
10mm Auto semi-automatic pistols
1911 platform
Semi-automatic pistols of the United States
Short recoil firearms